Wang Lixia (born June 1964) is a Chinese politician of Mongol heritage, currently serving as deputy secretary of the Chinese Communist Party Inner Mongolia Committee and chairwoman of the Inner Mongolia Autonomous Region People's Government (equivalent of a provincial governor). In 2019, she was the only female party secretary of a provincial-level capital in China. Prior to that, she served as party secretary of Hohhot, the capital of the Inner Mongolia Autonomous Region, and director of the United Front Department of the CCP Inner Mongolia Committee from 2016 to 2019 and vice governor of Shaanxi from 2013 to 2016.

Early life and education
An ethnic Mongol, Wang was born in Jianping County, Liaoning, in June 1964. She was accepted to Liaoning University in October 1981. Then she studied, then taught, at Shaanxi Institute of Finance and Economics (now College of Economics and Finance, Xi'an Jiaotong University).  She entered the workforce in September 1985, and joined the Chinese Communist Party (CCP) in December 1992.  In July 2000, she earned her Ph.D. in Economics from Xiamen University.

Political career
Wang began her political career in July 2000, when she was appointed deputy director of Shaanxi Provincial Statistical Bureau, and five years later promoted to the Director position. In January 2011, she was named acting mayor and deputy party secretary of Tongchuan, a prefecture-level city rich in coal. She was installed as mayor in April of that year. In January 2013 she was promoted to become vice-governor of Shaanxi, where she was responsible for commerce, health and family planning, opening up and Taiwan affairs.

In October 2016, Wang was transferred to north China's Inner Mongolia Autonomous Region, where she was appointed director of the United Front Department of the CCP Inner Mongolia Autonomous Region Committee and a member of the regional CCP Standing Committee. On August 31, 2019, she was appointed Communist Party Secretary of the capital Hohhot, breaking precedent and ending a long line of party secretaries who were native to Inner Mongolia. The post was vacated a few months earlier when her predecessor Yun Guangzhong was placed under investigation for corruption. In July 2021, she was appointed deputy party secretary and party branch secretary of Inner Mongolia. On August 5, she was appointed chairwoman of the Inner Mongolia Autonomous Region People's Government after Bu Xiaolin resigned.

Wang was a delegate to the 12th National People's Congress and is a member of the 13th National Committee of the Chinese People's Political Consultative Conference. She is an alternate member of the 19th CCP Central Committee.

References

1964 births
Living people
Liaoning University alumni
Xi'an Jiaotong University alumni
Xiamen University alumni
People's Republic of China politicians from Liaoning
Chinese Communist Party politicians from Liaoning
Alternate members of the 19th Central Committee of the Chinese Communist Party
Members of the 20th Central Committee of the Chinese Communist Party
Chinese women in politics
Political office-holders in Shaanxi
Chinese people of Mongolian descent